Martin Plum (born 26 February 1982) is a German politician for the CDU and since 2021 member of the Bundestag, the federal diet.

Life and politics 

Plum was born 1982 in the West German town of Viersen and was elected to the Bundestag in 2021.

References 

Living people
1982 births
People from Viersen
Members of the Bundestag 2021–2025
21st-century German politicians
Politicians from North Rhine-Westphalia
Members of the Bundestag for the Christian Democratic Union of Germany